Kadipur is a town, tehsil and a nagar panchayat in Sultanpur district in the Indian state of Uttar Pradesh. It is located a short distance from the bank of the Gomti River, at a crossroads between two roads heading from Sultanpur to Surapur and from Pratapgarh to Dostpur and then on to Akbarpur. On the north side of town is a stream with a steep ravine that drains the surrounding area. The road to Sultanpur crosses over this stream on a bridge. The lands surrounding Kadipur are average quality for agricultural purposes. As of 2011, Kadipur has a population of 8,010 people, in 1,216 households.

Kadipur tehsil has 4 blocks: Akhand Nagar, Dostpur, Kadipur and Karaundi Kala.
The Chairman of Kadipur is Vijay Bhan Singh(Munna).

Geography
Kadipur is located at 
. It has an average 
elevation of 90 metres (295 feet).

It is situated on the bank of Gomti River.

History
Kadipur was historically a relatively minor village without any particular importance until it was made the headquarters of a tehsil. It was chosen mainly because it was centrally located within the tehsil. At the turn of the 20th century, Kadipur had the tehsil offices, a thana, a pound, and a thriving upper primary school. It also had a bazar, which was described as "a very small one for a tahsili town". A village bank had also been established. As of 1901, its population was 793, with the majority of the population being Brahmins. Kadipur was then held by some minor Rajkumar zamindars, with some of the Brahmins holding under-proprietary rights.

Demographics

As of 2011 Indian Census, Kadipur had a total population of 8,010, of which 4,114 were males and 3,896 were females. Population within the age group of 0 to 6 years was 1,083. The total number of literates in Kadipur was 5,571, which constituted 69.6% of the population with male literacy of 75.6% and female literacy of 63.1%. The effective literacy rate of 7+ population of Kadipur was 80.4%, of which male literacy rate was 87.2% and female literacy rate was 73.2%. The Scheduled Castes population was 1,304. Kadipur had 1216 households in 2011.

According to the 2001 census, Kadipur had a population of 6795. Males constitute 53% of the population and females 47%. Kadipur has an average literacy rate of 62%, higher than the national average of 59.5%: male literacy is 69%, and female literacy is 55%. In Kadipur, 16% of the population is under 6 years of age.

Amenities
As of 2011, Kadipur has 2 hospitals with a total of 34 beds. It has 17 primary schools. There is no public library or fire department; the nearest in both cases is at Sultanpur 40 km away. Wastewater and sewage are disposed of using an open drainage system. Water supply comes from both tube well and hand pump sources.

Villages
Kadipur CD block has the following 94 villages:

References

Cities and towns in Sultanpur district